Sriharipuram is a neighbourhood in the city of Visakhapatnam, India. The neighbourhood is considered as the major residential area in the district. It is located within the jurisdiction of the Greater Visakhapatnam Municipal Corporation, which is responsible for the civic amenities in Sriharipuram . It is located on the south fringe of Visakhapatnam city.

Location and Geography

Sriharipuram is located about 11 km from Visakhapatnam Airport and about 12 km from Visakhapatnam railway station. It lies to the south fringe of Visakhapatnam City and is loosely bordered by Gajuwaka to the west and Malkapuram to the east, Marripalem to the north, Gopalapatnam to the north-west and Pedagantyada to the south-west.

Residential Areas

Jawahar Nagar, Ex-Service men Colony, Pavanaputra Nagar, Ajanta Colony, Ram Nagar, Burma Colony, Indira colony, Coromandel, Bala Ganapathi Street and Gullelapalem VUDA Colony  are the local residential areas in Sriharipuram.

Hindustan Petroleum Corporation Ltd., Coromandel, Zinc Smelter, Hindustan Shipyard Ltd. are the major industries here.

Transport

Sriharipuram is well connected by road. It also has major District roads connecting it to nearby mandals and Visakhapatnam. APSRTC runs bus services from Gajuwaka bus station to major parts of the state and Visakhapatnam city.

APSRTC routes

References

Neighbourhoods in Visakhapatnam